Otley was a parliamentary constituency between 1885 and 1918 centred on the town of Otley, then in the West Riding of Yorkshire and now in West Yorkshire.  It returned one Member of Parliament (MP) to the House of Commons of the Parliament of the United Kingdom, elected by the first past the post system.

History 

The constituency was created when the two-member Eastern West Riding of Yorkshire was divided by the Redistribution of Seats Act 1885 for the 1885 general election in six new single-member constituencies.  It was abolished for the 1918 general election, when it was largely replaced by the new Pudsey & Otley constituency.

Boundaries 
The Redistribution of Seats Act 1885 provided that the constituency was to consist of-
the Sessional Division of Otley and
the Parishes of Beamsley in Addingham, Beamsley in Skipton, Bingley and Micklethwaite, Hazlewood with Storiths, Morton, and Nesfield with Langbar.

Members of Parliament

Elections

Elections in the 1880s

Elections in the 1890s

Elections in the 1900s

Elections in the 1910s 

General Election 1914–15:

Another General Election was required to take place before the end of 1915. The political parties had been making preparations for an election to take place and by the July 1914, the following candidates had been selected; 
Liberal: James Duncan
Unionist:

References 

Parliamentary constituencies in Yorkshire and the Humber (historic)
Constituencies of the Parliament of the United Kingdom established in 1885
Constituencies of the Parliament of the United Kingdom disestablished in 1918
Otley